Sixto Raimundo "Mumo" Peralta Salso (born 16 April 1979, in Comodoro Rivadavia) is an Argentine retired footballer who last played as a midfielder for Chilean club Universidad de Concepción.

Club career 
He made his professional debut against Lanús, 23 August 1996. He is a declared supporter of Patagonian-based club Comisión de Actividades Infantiles, where he took his first steps as a professional footballer, and where his father is president. Peralta spent a successful season at Ipswich Town in 2001–02, playing 22 matches during Ipswich's second season in the English Premier League. However, the club was relegated, and Peralta's loan was not made permanent. He then moved to Mexico and back to his native Argentina before joining CFR Cluj in Romania, arriving just in time to be part of the club's first championship season in 2007–2008. He later joined Chilean side Universidad Católica and continued his tour of Chile, signing for Universidad de Concepción. On the 2 March 2014, Peralta scored a last-gasp equaliser in a 2–2 draw with Audax Italiano played at Estadio Bicentenario de La Florida. Audax Italiano went ahead when Felipe Mora scored in added time, but Peralta sparked mad scenes when he scored a dramatic last minute equaliser. Peralta described the goal as "one of the greatest moments of my career" in a post-match interview.

International career 
He was part of the squad of Argentina Under-20 team at 1999 FIFA World Youth Championship.

Honours

Player
UANL
InterLiga: 2005, 2006
CFR Cluj
Liga I: 2007–08, 2009–10, 2011–12
Romanian Cup: 2008, 2009, 2010
Romanian Supercup: 2009
Universidad de Concepción
Chilean Cup: 2015

References

External links
 Argentine Primera statistics
archivio.inter.it bio at Internazionale
Player profile at River Plate's official website

1979 births
Living people
People from Comodoro Rivadavia
Argentine people of Spanish descent
Argentine footballers
Argentine expatriate footballers
Argentina youth international footballers
Argentina under-20 international footballers
Club Atlético Huracán footballers
Racing Club de Avellaneda footballers
Inter Milan players
Torino F.C. players
Ipswich Town F.C. players
Santos Laguna footballers
Club Atlético River Plate footballers
Association football midfielders
Premier League players
Tigres UANL footballers
Santiago Wanderers footballers
Club Deportivo Universidad Católica footballers
Universidad de Concepción footballers
CFR Cluj players
Liga I players
Serie B players
Chilean Primera División players
Argentine Primera División players
Liga MX players
Expatriate footballers in Chile
Expatriate footballers in England
Expatriate footballers in Romania
Expatriate footballers in Italy
Expatriate footballers in Mexico
Argentine expatriate sportspeople in Chile
Argentine expatriate sportspeople in Romania
Argentine expatriate sportspeople in Italy
Argentine expatriate sportspeople in Mexico
Argentine expatriate sportspeople in England